Harmony Hill may refer to:

 Harmony Hill, Pennsylvania, a populated area in the town of East Bradford, Pennsylvania.
 Harmony Hill, Texas, an unincorporated area in Rusk County, Texas.
 Harmony Hill, Wisconsin, an unincorporated community in the town of Scott, Wisconsin.
 Harmony Hill United Methodist Church, a church in Stillwater Township, New Jersey.
 Harmony Hill, the first album from the band, Dervish.
 Harmony Hill Bridge, an alternate name for Gibson's Covered Bridge, in East Bradford, Pennsylvania.
 Harmony Hill Baptist Church, a Baptist church located in Lufkin, Texas